The soldier ctenotus (Ctenotus militaris)  is a species of skink found in the Northern Territory and Western Australia.

References

militaris
Reptiles described in 1975
Taxa named by Glen Milton Storr